An election to the Carmarthenshire County Council was held in March 1949. It was preceded by the 1946 election and followed, by the 1952 election.

Overview of the result

After steadily increasing their representation throughout the inter-war period, the Labour Party finally won a majority on the Council, and strengthened their hold by taking nine of the ten vacancies on the aldermanic bench. Labour victories included taking a seat in the Borough of Carmarthen for the first time. Gwynfor Evans, President of Plaid Cymru, was returned for the Llangadog ward.

Boundary changes

There were no boundary changes.

Unopposed returns

There were a number of unopposed returns, both in Labour held seats and in the western part of the county, which was described as still being 'traditionally Liberal in character'.

Contested elections

While there were more unopposed returns than in 1946, many wards were keenly contested. Electioneering reached a peak in Llanelli where an Independent association was formed to fight the elections as a united front against Labour. However, Labour won all but two seats in Llanelli town.

Retiring aldermen faced the electorate for the first time since 1937. In Llangyndeyrn, Alderman Rev. James Jenkins, a member of the Council since 1925, was defeated by the retiring Labour councilor. However, Dame Gwendoline Trubshaw was one of only two Independent candidates to secure election in Llanelli.

Summary of results

This section summarises the detailed results which are noted in the following sections. In some cases there is an ambiguity in the sources over the party affiliations and this is explained below where relevant.

This table summarises the result of the elections in all wards. 53 councillors were elected.

|}

|}

|}

Ward results

Abergwili

Ammanford No.1

Ammanford No.2
Boundary Change.

Berwick

Burry Port

Caio

Carmarthen Division 1

Carmarthen Division 2

Carmarthen Division 3

Cenarth

Cilycwm

Conwil

Cwmamman

Hengoed

Kidwelly

Laugharne

Llanarthney

Llanboidy

Llandebie North

Llandebie South

Llandilo Rural

Llandilo Urban

Llandovery

Llandyssilio

Llanedy

Llanegwad

Llanelly Division.1

Llanelly Division 2

Llanelly Division 3

Llanelly Division 4

Llanelly Division 5

Llanelly Division 6

Llanelly Division 7

Llanelly Division 8

Llanelly Division 9

Llanfihangel Aberbythick

Llanfihangel-ar-Arth

Llangadog

Llangeler

Llangendeirne

Llangennech

Llangunnor

Llanon

Llansawel

Llanstephan

Llanybyther

Myddfai

Pembrey

Pontyberem

Quarter Bach

Rhydcymmerai

St Clears

St Ishmaels

Trelech

Trimsaran

Westfa

Whitland

Election of aldermen

In addition to the 57 councillors the council consisted of 19 county aldermen. Aldermen were elected by the council, and served a six-year term. Following the elections the following nine aldermen were elected.

W. Douglas Hughes, Labour
Emrys Aubrey, Labour
T.S. Bowen, Labour
T.W. Morgan, Labour
D.J. Jones, Labour
W.W. Davies, Labour
J. Amos Jones, Labour
W.T. Griffiths, Labour
J. Llewellyn Evans, Labour
Dame Gwendoline Trubshaw, Independent

By-elections
Following the selection of aldermen the following by-elections were held. In Llanelli, the Independents gained two seats but Labour won the seat vacated by Dame Gwendoline Trubshaw.

Berwick by-election

Kidwelly by-election

Llanedy by-election

Llanelly Division 2 by-election

Llanelly Division 5 by-election

Llanelly Division 6 by-election

Llanelly Division 7 by-election

Pontyberem by-election

Quarter Bach by-election

Westfa by-election

References

Carmarthenshire County Council elections
1949 Welsh local elections